Rachid El Morabity is a Moroccan athlete born 3 March 1982 in Zagora. He is a specialist of ultra-trail, and has won the Marathon des Sables 9 times (2011, 2014, 2015, 2016, 2017, 2018, 2019, 2021, and 2022). He was also ranked 2nd overall in the OCC in August 2016 and came 2nd in the UT4M 90 in August 2015.

Results 

 Marathon des Sables – 2011 – 1st place
 Marathon des Sables – 2014 – 1st place
 Marathon des Sables – 2015 – 1st place
 UTAM 90 – 2015 – 2nd place
 Marathon des Sables – 2016 – 1st place
 OCC – UTMB – 2016 – 2nd place
 Marathon des Sables – 2017 - 1st place
 Marathon des Sables (Peru) – 2017 – 1st place
 Marathon des Sables – 2018 – 1st place
 Marathon des Sables – 2019 – 1st place
 Marathon des Sables – 2021 – 1st place
 Marathon des Sables – 2022 – 1st place

Personal life 
Morabity's family farms watermelons. His younger brother, Mohamed, is also an ultramarathon runner and has placed several times in Marathon des Sables.

References

External links
 

Male ultramarathon runners
Moroccan male long-distance runners
1982 births
Living people